Liparoceras is an extinct fossil ammonite species from the Early Jurassic period of England, and is found in lower Lias deposits. Its name means 'fat head' and this is due to its broad shell. The venter is wide and finely ribbed with no keel and it has two rows of tubercules on each whorl.

Distribution
Jurassic deposits of Argentina, Europe, British Columbia and North Africa.

References

Arkell et al., 1957. Mesozoic Ammonoidea, in Treatise on Invertebrate Paleontology, (Part L); Geological Soc. of America and University of Kansas press.

External links
 Liparoceras at fossilmuseum.net
 Liparoceras at the Whitby Museum

Ammonitida genera
Liparoceratidae
Jurassic ammonites
Fossils of Great Britain
Pliensbachian life